Naomi Alderman (born 1974) is an English novelist and game writer. She is best known for her speculative science fiction novel The Power, which won the Women's Prize for Fiction in 2017.

Biography 
Alderman was born in London, the daughter of Geoffrey Alderman, a specialist in Anglo-Jewish history who has described himself as an unconventional Orthodox Jew. Alderman was educated at South Hampstead High School and Lincoln College, Oxford, where she read Philosophy, Politics and Economics. After she left Oxford, she worked in children's publishing and then for a law firm, editing their publications. She went on to study creative writing at the University of East Anglia before becoming a novelist. In 2007, The Sunday Times named her their Young Writer of the Year. In 2007, she was named as one of the 25 Writers of the Future by Waterstones.

In 2012, Alderman was appointed Professor of Creative Writing at Bath Spa University, England. In 2013, she was included in the Granta once-a-decade list of 20 best young writers. She writes a monthly technology column for The Guardian.

Alderman became an advocate for feminism in her teenage years and has since supported women's rights, which has influenced her works. She stated in a 2018 New York Times interview, "When I was a teenager in the 1990s, it was a common thing among young women to say that feminism's battles are won. Now I think it's very horrifically obvious that that is not the case." She wrote The Power to address points made by the fourth-wave feminism movement and cites the Me Too movement as an inspiration and a source of similar dialogue.

Works 
Alderman was the lead writer for Perplex City, an alternate reality game, at Mind Candy from 2004 through to June 2007. She went on to become lead writer on the running app Zombies, Run! which launched in 2012 and on the walking app The Walk which launched in December 2013. In 2018 The Walk was turned into a podcast and released through Panoply Media.

Alderman's literary début came in 2006 with Disobedience, a well-received, if somewhat controversial, novel about a North London rabbi's bisexual daughter living in New York, which won her the 2006 Orange Award for New Writers, the 2007 Sunday Times Young Writer of the Year Award, and a feature as one of the Waterstones 25 Writers for the Future. It led her to reject her life as a practising Jew. "I went into the novel religious and by the end I wasn't. I wrote myself out of it," she told Claire Armitstead of The Guardian in 2016. Her second novel, The Lessons, was published in 2010.

Her third novel, The Liars' Gospel (Viking), with Jesus portrayed as the Jewish preacher Yehoshuah, was published in paperback in 2012. Reviewing the book, Shoshi Ish-Horowicz in the Jewish Renaissance magazine described it as "an entertaining, engaging read" but found the story it told "uncomfortable and problematic. Your enjoyment of the novel will depend on how you respond to the premise that Jesus was, potentially, an 'inconsequential preacher'". Set in and around Jerusalem between Pompey's Siege of Jerusalem (63 BC) and Titus' Siege of Jerusalem (70), it is narrated in four main sections from the perspective of four key figures: Mary, Judas Iscariot, Caiaphas and Barabbas. All three novels have been serialised on BBC Radio 4's Book at Bedtime.

She wrote the narrative for The Winter House, an online interactive linear short story visualised by Jey Biddulph. The project was commissioned by BookTrust as part of the Story campaign, supported by Arts Council England. Her Doctor Who novel Borrowed Time was published in June 2011.

In 2012, Alderman was selected as a protégée by Margaret Atwood as part of the Rolex Mentor and Protégé Arts Initiative, an international philanthropic programme that pairs masters in their disciplines with emerging talents for a year of one-to-one creative exchange. Atwood and Alderman co-wrote “The Happy Zombie Sunrise Home” and self-published the work online on Wattpad in 2012.

Alderman's fourth novel, The Power, was published in 2016. The Power is dedicated to and influenced by Atwood. The Power won the Women's Prize for Fiction in 2017. Alderman has confirmed that she has sold the rights of The Power to Sister Pictures, the same company who produced Broadchurch, after receiving eleven offers. She is hoping for a multi-season run to explore and delve into the world she created in The Power.

Bibliography

References

External links
Personal blog
Alderman at The Guardian – indexes her contributions
Alderman at agent David Higham
 "Naomi Alderman's first novel ...", The Guardian, 20 February 2006, based on an interview
Interview in Scotland on Sunday (April 2010) at The Scotsman
"UK authors of the future unveiled" (2007) at BBC News
 

1974 births
Living people
21st-century English women writers
21st-century English novelists
Academics of Bath Spa University
Alumni of Lincoln College, Oxford
Alumni of the University of East Anglia
English Jewish writers
Jewish novelists
People educated at South Hampstead High School